Marienhausen is a municipality in the district of Neuwied, in Rhineland-Palatinate, Germany.

References

Neuwied (district)